Pavel Přindiš (born August 17, 1961 in Olomouc) is a Czechoslovak-Czech slalom canoeist who competed from the late 1980s to the mid-1990s. He won two bronze medals in the K1 team event at the ICF Canoe Slalom World Championships (1991 for Czechoslovakia, 1993 for the Czech Republic).

Přindiš also finished 24th in the K1 event at the 1992 Summer Olympics in Barcelona.

His son Vít is also a medalist from World Championships.

World Cup individual podiums

References

Sports-reference.com profile

1961 births
Canoeists at the 1992 Summer Olympics
Czech male canoeists
Czechoslovak male canoeists
Living people
Olympic canoeists of Czechoslovakia
Medalists at the ICF Canoe Slalom World Championships
Sportspeople from Olomouc